Chubby Creek is a stream in the U.S. state of Mississippi. It is a tributary to the Wolf River.

Chubby Creek is a name derived from the Choctaw language, and several attempts have been made to explain its meaning.

References

Rivers of Mississippi
Rivers of Benton County, Mississippi
Mississippi placenames of Native American origin